Christmastime in the LBC is the seventh Christmas album released by KROQ-FM show Kevin and Bean.  The album was released only on audio cassette, and was the very last of the Kevin and Bean Christmas albums to be released on that format.  The album is currently out of print and has not been reissued on CD as of February 2021.

Track listing 

Side A
 Kevin and Bean: "Introduction"
 Jimmy Kimmel (in the style of Snoop Dogg): "Christmastime in the LBC" - 3:40
 Reel Big Fish: "Christmas Medley"
 Big Tad: "Jingle Bells"
 Better Than Ezra: "Egg Nog Singalong"
 Adam Carolla: "Mr. Birchum's Gift Guide" - 3:38
 Local H: "Disgruntled Christmas"
 Beck & Dust Brothers: "Little Drum Machine Boy"
 "Chris Carter Christmas"
 Cocteau Twins: "Frosty the Snowman" 
 Voodoo Glow Skulls: "Feliz Navidad"
Side B
 Adam Sandler: "The Chanukah Song"
 Jimmy Kimmel (as Jimmy the Sports Guy): "Jimmy's Wish"
 Goldfinger: "White Christmas"
 Poe: "Grandma Got Run Over by a Reindeer"
 Bobcat Goldthwait: "Fuck the Police"
 Korn: "Christmas Song"
 Adam Carolla and Dr. Drew: "Bethlehem Calling"
 Everclear: "Santa Baby" - 3:58
 Squirrel Nut Zippers: "Santa Claus is Smoking Reefer"
 Kevin and Bean: "Heartfelt Holiday Greetings from the Kevin and Bean Morning Show"

1996 Christmas albums
Christmas albums by American artists
Christmas compilation albums
1996 compilation albums